Incorporated Elements is an American music production company founded in the late 1990s by producer/DJ, Ric Robbins (also known as DJ Form). Incorporated Elements works in many areas of production, including artist production and development and music for film, television, video games, and advertising.  Incorporated Elements works out of the Nashville, Tennessee, based studio named the Inc.Spot.

Robbins' ultimate vision for Incorporated Elements is that it becomes a company that helps up-and-coming producers, artists, songwriters, engineers, and bands fully realize their goals and dreams in the music industry.  I.E. is making plans to open a multi-use complex in the Franklin, Tennessee, area to offer writing rooms, studios, training, and practice rooms.  They want to aid in launching the next generation of music professionals.

Awards and nominations 
Incorporated Elements has been nominated for 3 Grammy Awards for their work with the hip-hop group, Grits, and R&B/Pop singer, Ayiesha Woods.

As a production team, Incorporated Elements has also been nominated for nine Dove Awards, winning three.

Discography

Production and writing

Production and writing for film and television
Dark and Lovely TV commercial (2013)
Gillette TV commercials (2012)
For Colored Girls (Motion Picture – 2010)
Lie To Me (Fox – 2010)
Nikita (TV series) (CW – 2010)
Takers (Motion Picture – 2009)
Dirt (FX – 2008)
Friday Night Lights (TV series) (NBC – 2008)
The Shot (VH-1 – 2007)
Kimora: Life in the Fab Lane (Style – 2007)
Slow Burn (2007)
Bones (TV series) (Fox – 2007)
Fast and Furious: Tokyo Drift (2007)
Big Momma's House 2 (2006)
The Perfect Man (2005) 
Spanglish (2004 – Oscar nominated)
Something's Gotta Give (2003 – Oscar nominated)
Lockdown (2000)
America's Next Top Model (VH-1, UPN)
Las Vegas (NBC) 
Joan of Arcadia (CBS) 
Boston Public (Fox) 
MTV Cribs (MTV)
Pimp My Ride (MTV)
Made (MTV) 
High School Stories (MTV) 
Punk'd (MTV)
Most Requested (MTV) 
Your Face or Mine (MTV) 
Driven (VH-1) 
Third Watch (NBC)
Resurrection Blvd. (Showtime)
and over 450 others.

Other remixes, DJ, programming 
Kelly Clarkson – tour pre-production & DJ/bandmember – Ric "DJ Form" Robbins (2007–2011)
Kirk Franklin (2007)
The Newsboys (2007)
Britt Nicole (2007)
Portable Sounds – Toby Mac (2007)
Chaotic Resolve – Plumb (2006) 
Bounce Remix – George Huff (2005)
Welcome To Diverse City – Toby Mac (2004)
All Things New – Steven Curtis Chapman (2004)
John Reuben Remix album – 5 songs (2004) 
The Art of Transformation remix album – GRITS (2004)
One Love – Kimberley Locke (2004) 
Here We Go Remix – GRITS and Talib Kweli (2003) 
Beautiful Lumps of Coal – Plumb (2003) 
Momentum – TobyMac (2001) 
Left of the Middle (single remixes) – Natalie Imbruglia (1999) 
SonicFlood – SonicFlood (1999) 
Vegas Car Chasers – Silage (1998) 
Candy Coated Waterdrops – Plumb (1998) 
White Lines Remix – Duran Duran (1997) 
Under The Influence – Anointed (1996) 
Lovin' The Day – Out of Eden – (1995)

References

External links
Connorflanaganmusic.com
Connor Flanagan on iTunes

Music production companies
American record labels
Record labels established in 1995